The mixed doubles tournament of the 2015 Badminton Asia Junior Championships was held from July 1 to 5. The defending champions of the last edition were Zheng Siwei and Chen Qingchen of China. As the defending champion Chen Qingchen try to defend their title that she got last year with Huang Kaixiang, but this time with different partner Zheng Siwei (seeded No.1). Chen finally emerge as the mixed doubles champion for the second time after she and Zheng defeat the second seeds from South Korea Choi Jong-woo and Kim Hye-jeong in the finals with the score 21–8, 21–12.

Seeded

 Zheng Siwei / Chen Qingchen (champion)
 Choi Jong-woo / Kim Hye-jeong (final)
 Arjun Madathil Ramachandran / Kuhoo Garg (second round)
 Beno Drajat / Yulfira Barkah (quarter final)
 Yantoni Edy Saputra / Marsheilla Gischa Islami (second round)
 Pakin Kuna-Anuvit / Kwanchanok Sudjaipraparat (first round)
 Fachriza Abimanyu / Apriani Rahayu (semi final)
 He Jiting / Du Yue (semi final)

Draw

Finals

Top half

Section 1

Section 2

Section 3

Section 4

Bottom half

Section 5

Section 6

Section 7

Section 8

References

External links 
Main Draw

Mixed
Asia Junior